The San Juan del Oro River is a river in the Potosí Department in Bolivia.

See also
 Río Grande de San Juan
List of rivers of Bolivia

References
Rand McNally, The New International Atlas, 1993.

Rivers of Potosí Department